Robert Livingston Armstrong (July 4, 1850 – December 3, 1917) was an American professional baseball player. He played 12 of 21 games, 11 in center field, for the Fort Wayne Kekiongas in the first professional league, the 1871 National Association of Professional Base Ball Players (NAPBBP).

Previously Armstrong played three seasons for the Maryland club of Baltimore, Maryland in the National Association of Base Ball Players. The Marylands were a strong club among the hundreds of NABBP members but a weak club among the twelve that contested the first professional pennant race in 1869, or the second one in 1870.

Bob Armstrong was the son of John Horatio Armstrong and Caroline Amelia Scheldt and great grandson of John Armstrong Jr. He was 6'2" and was married to Betty Arnold. Armstrong was a Baltimore native like most of his Maryland teammates.

External links

Find a Grave

1850 births
1917 deaths
19th-century baseball players
Major League Baseball center fielders
Baltimore Marylands (NABBP) players
Fort Wayne Kekiongas players
Baseball players from Baltimore